1,3,5-Triethylbenzene is a chemical compound of the group of aromatic hydrocarbons.

Preparation 
1,3,5-Triethylbenzene can be prepared by a Friedel-Crafts alkylation of benzene with ethyl bromide in presence of aluminum chloride.

Properties 
1,3,5-Triethylbenzene is a flammable, hard to ignite, colorless liquid that is almost insoluble in water. The refractive index is 1.495

Uses 
1,3,5-Triethylbenzene can be used in synthesis of a series of di- and trinucleating ligands.

Safety notes 
The vapour of 1,3,5-Triethylbenzene can form an explosive mixture with air (flash point: 76 °C).

References

See also
1,3,5-Triheptylbenzene

Alkylbenzenes